nvSRAM is a type of non-volatile random-access memory (NVRAM). nvSRAM extends the functionality of basic SRAM by adding non-volatile storage such as an EEPROM to the SRAM chip. In operation, data is written to and read from the SRAM portion with high-speed access; the data in SRAM can then be stored into or retrieved from the non-volatile storage at lower speeds when needed.

nvSRAM is one of the advanced NVRAM technologies that are fast replacing the battery-backed static random-access memory (BBSRAM), especially for applications that need battery-free solutions and long-term retention at SRAM speeds. nvSRAMs are used in a wide range of situations: networking, aerospace, and medical, among many others where the preservation of data is critical and where batteries are impractical.

nvSRAM is faster than EPROM and EEPROM solutions.

Description
When reading and writing data, a nvSRAM acts no differently than a standard asynchronous SRAM. The attached processor or controller sees an 8-bit SRAM interface and nothing else.  The STORE operation stores data that is in an SRAM array in the non-volatile part.  Cypress and Simtek nvSRAM have three ways to store data in the non-volatile area.  They are:

 autostore
 hardware store
 software store

Autostore happens automatically when the data main voltage source drops below the device's operating voltage.  When this occurs, the power control is switched from VCC to a capacitor. The capacitor will power the chip long enough to store the SRAM contents into the non-volatile part. The HSB (Hardware Store Busy) pin externally initiates a non-volatile hardware store operation. Using the HSB signal, which requests a non-volatile hardware STORE cycle, is optional.  A software store is initiated by a certain sequence of operations. When the defined operations are done in sequence the software store is initiated.

nvSRAM with SONOS technology

SONOS is a cross-sectional structure of MOSFET used in Non-volatile memory such as EEPROM and flash memories. nvSRAM built with SONOS technology is the combination of SRAM and EEPROM. The SRAM cells are paired one to one with EEPROM cells. The nvSRAMs are in the CMOS process, with the EEPROM cells having a SONOS stack to provide nonvolatile storage.
nvSRAM combines the standard SRAM cells with EEPROM cells in SONOS technology to provide a fast read/write access and 20 years of data retention without power. The SRAM cells are paired one-to-one with EEPROM cells. The nvSRAMs are in the CMOS process, with the EEPROM cells having a SONOS stack to provide nonvolatile storage. When normal power is applied, the device looks and behaves in a similar manner as a standard SRAM. However, when power drops out, each cell’s contents can be stored automatically in the nonvolatile element positioned above the SRAM cell. This nonvolatile element uses standard CMOS process technology to obtain the high performance of standard SRAMs. In addition, the SONOS technology is highly reliable and supports 1 million STORE operations

The SONOS memory uses an insulating layer such as silicon nitride with traps as the charge storage layer. The traps in the nitride capture the carriers injected from the channel and retain the charge. This type of memory is also known as “Charge Trap Memory.” Since the charge storage layer is an insulator, this storage mechanism is inherently less sensitive to the tunnel oxide defects and is more robust for data retention. In SONOS, the Oxide-Nitride-Oxide(ONO) stack is engineered to maximize the charge-trapping efficiency during erase and program operations and minimize the charge loss during the retention by controlling the deposition parameters in the ONO formation.

Advantages of SONOS technology:
lower voltages required for program/erase operations compared to Floating-gate MOSFET
Inherently less sensitive to the tunnel oxide defects
Robust data retention

Applications
 Data logging
 POS terminals/smart terminals
 Terminals can store payment transaction records locally for later processing, reducing delays and intrusion vulnerability.
 Motor vehicle crash boxes
 Medical equipment
 High-end servers
 Environments where batteries for BBSRAMs are unfeasible
 Remote devices where field service is unfeasible

Comparisons with other types of memories

References

External links
nvSRAM product site  Cypress Semiconductor
APP2372: A Comparison between Battery Backed NV SRAMs and NOVRAMS  Maxim Integrated
MRAM Replaces nvSRAM  Everspin Technologies Inc.

Types of RAM
Non-volatile memory